District 10 of the Oregon State Senate comprises parts of Marion and Polk counties, including much of Salem. The last Senator elected to represent this district was a Democrat Deb Patterson (politician), in 2018 Republican Jackie Winters of Salem was elected, she died of lung cancer on May 29, 2019. Denyc Boles, who had been serving as the Representative for District 19 in the Oregon House of Representatives, was appointed on June 25, 2019 as Winters' replacement. Senator Patterson ousted Denyc Boles in November, 2020 and will fulfill the remainder of Jackie Winters' term.

Election results
District boundaries have changed over time. From 1993 until 2003, the district covered parts of east Portland. Since 2003, the district has covered portions of the Salem metropolitan area.

References

10
Marion County, Oregon
Polk County, Oregon